Brian Hyland (born November 12, 1943) is an American pop singer and instrumentalist who was particularly successful during the early 1960s. He continued recording into the 1970s. AllMusic journalist Jason Ankeny says "Hyland's puppy-love pop virtually defined the sound and sensibility of bubblegum during the pre-Beatles era." Although his status as a teen idol faded, he went on to release several country-influenced albums and had additional chart hits later in his career.

Biography
Hyland was born in Woodhaven, Queens, New York City. He studied guitar and clarinet as a child, and sang in his church choir. When aged 14 he co-founded the harmony group the Del-Fi's, which recorded a demo but failed to secure a recording contract. Hyland was eventually signed by Kapp Records as a solo artist, issuing his debut single, "Rosemary", in late 1959. The label employed the Brill Building songwriting duo of Lee Pockriss and Paul Vance to work with Hyland on the follow-up, "Four Little Heels (The Clickety Clack Song)", which was a minor hit, and the songwriting duo continued to work with Hyland.

In August 1960, Hyland scored his first and biggest hit single, at the age of 16, "Itsy Bitsy Teenie Weenie Yellow Polka Dot Bikini", written by Vance and Pockriss. It was a novelty song that reached No. 1 on the Billboard Hot 100 chart (No. 8 in the UK) and sold almost a million copies in the first two months of its release and over two million copies in total.

Hyland moved on to ABC-Paramount Records, where he began working with the songwriting and production team of Gary Geld and Peter Udell, and further hits followed with "Let Me Belong to You" and "I'll Never Stop Wanting You".

In 1961, Hyland appeared as himself on the March 6 episode of the game show To Tell the Truth. He received three votes.

Hyland's other major hit during this period was 1962's "Sealed with a Kiss", which reached No. 3 in 1962 on both the American and UK Singles Chart. Another 1962 hit was "Ginny Come Lately", which reached No. 21 on the U.S. chart and No. 5 in the UK. Hyland's 1962 Top 30 hit "Warmed-Over Kisses (Leftover Love)" incorporated elements of country music into his work, which continued with singles including "I May Not Live to See Tomorrow" and "I'm Afraid to Go Home" and on the 1964 album Country Meets Folk. This approach was out of step with the changes brought about by British Invasion bands. Hyland's commercial success became limited, but he continued that in vein and had further hits with "The Joker Went Wild" and "Run, Run, Look and See", working with producer Snuff Garrett and session musicians including J. J. Cale and Leon Russell.

Hyland appeared on national television programs such as American Bandstand and The Jackie Gleason Show, and toured both internationally and around America with Dick Clark in the Caravan of Stars. The caravan was in Dallas, Texas, on the day of the assassination of President Kennedy in 1963. To commemorate the event, Hyland wrote the song "Mail Order Gun", which he recorded and eventually released on his 1970 eponymous album.
 
From 1963 through 1969, Hyland scored several minor hits but none reached higher than No. 20 ("The Joker Went Wild") on the U.S. pop chart. An album released in 1964 featured numbers that hearkened back to the 1950s ,including such hits as "Pledging My Love" and "Moments to Remember"—at a time when The Beatles and other British Invasion acts were drowning out American artists. Hyland afterward shifted into a phase of recording country music and folk rock styles. Songs such as "I'm Afraid to Go Home" and "Two Brothers" had an American Civil War theme. Hyland played the harmonica on a few numbers.

Hyland attempted several departures from the norm, including the psychedelic single "Get the Message" (No. 91 on the U.S. pop chart), and "Holiday for Clowns" (No. 94), but despite their more contemporary arrangements, they failed to get much airplay. He went on to chart just two more top 40 hits, both cover versions: "Gypsy Woman", a 1961 hit for the Impressions written by Curtis Mayfield, and "Lonely Teardrops", a 1959 hit for Jackie Wilson. Hyland recorded both in 1970, and Del Shannon produced the tracks. "Gypsy Woman" reached No. 3 on the 1970 U.S. pop chart, making it the second-biggest hit of his career, selling over one million copies, and being certified gold by the RIAA in January 1971. Two of his previous hits, "Itsy Bitsy Teenie Weenie Yellow Polkadot Bikini" and "Sealed with a Kiss", were also awarded gold discs.

In 1975, "Sealed With A Kiss" became a hit again in the UK (No. 7) and Hyland performed the song on Top of the Pops on July 31 of the same year. By 1977, he and his family had settled in New Orleans, and in 1979 the In a State of Bayou album, on which he had worked with Allen Toussaint, was issued by the Private Stock label.

In June 1988, Dutch singer Albert West asked Hyland to record with him some duets of Hyland's hits: "Itsy Bitsy Teenie Weenie Yellow Polkadot Bikini", "Sealed With A Kiss", and "Ginny Come Lately". The latter song had been covered before by West in 1973, becoming a huge European hit and his biggest. Their duet of "Itsy Bitsy ..." was released as a single and reached No. 43 on the Dutch singles chart. Hyland and West performed on TV shows in Germany, Belgium and a Dutch TV special in Aruba.

Hyland has continued to tour internationally with his son Bodi, who assists on drums from time to time.
He is also a second cousin to Larry Fine of The Three Stooges.

Catalog consolidation
From 1960 to 1977, Hyland recorded a total of eleven albums for several different record companies. A twelfth album, Young Years, was a reissue. They included Leader Records, ABC-Paramount Records, Philips Records, Dot Records and Uni Records. Over the years, these record labels were consolidated and the recordings are now controlled by Universal Music. Universal has yet to release a CD compilation that includes all of Hyland's charted singles, invariably omitting a handful of minor singles that made the Billboard Top 100 (or the Bubbling Under chart).

1967 – Leader Records ("Itsy Bitsy ...") owner Kapp Records sold to MCA, Inc. and becomes co-owned with Uni Records ("Gypsy Woman").
1974 – Dot Records ("Tragedy") sold to ABC Records ("Sealed with a Kiss")
1979 – MCA Records buys ABC Records
1998 – MCA parent Universal Music buys Philips Records ("The Joker Went Wild") owner PolyGram completing the catalog consolidation

Discography

Albums

1960: The Bashful Blond
1961: Let Me Belong to You
1962: Sealed with a Kiss
1963: Country Meets Folk
1964: Here's to Our Love
1965: Rockin' Folk
1966: The Joker Went Wild
1967: Young Years (a reissue of Here's to Our Love)
1969: Tragedy (# 160 Hot 200)
1969: Stay and Love Me All Summer
1970: Brian Hyland (# 171 Hot 200)
1977: In a State of Bayou
1987: Sealed with a Kiss
1994: Greatest Hits
2002: Blue Christmas
2006: Bashful Blond//Let Me Belong to You
2007: Basic Lady
2007: Rockin' Folk/Joker Went Wild
2007: Country Meets Folk/Here's to Our Love
2009: Triple Threat Vol. 1
2010: Triple Threat Vol. 2
2010: Another Blue Christmas (EP)
2011: Triple Threat Vol. 3
2014: Sealed with a Kiss and All the Greatest Hits; 1960–1962
2015: Philips Years & More; 1964-1968
2015: The Very Best of Brian Hyland

Singles

See also
List of artists who reached number one in the United States
List of artists who reached number one on the Australian singles chart
List of acts who appeared on American Bandstand

References

External links
BrianHyland.com: Official site
Last.fm
Youtube- Official Brian Hyland Channel
Yahoo Music, Artist Page- Brian Hyland
Brian Hyland biography from Universal Music

1943 births
Living people
American male pop singers
People from Woodhaven, Queens
Uni Records artists
Dot Records artists
Philips Records artists
Kapp Records artists
ABC Records artists
American male singers
American child singers
Child pop musicians